New York State Route 340 (NY 340) is a  state highway in southeastern Rockland County, New York, in the United States. Though it is signed as an east–west route, it actually follows a north–south alignment. The southern terminus of the route is at the New Jersey state line in Palisades, where it becomes County Route 501 (CR 501). The northern terminus is at an intersection with NY 303 in Orangeburg; however, according to the New York State Department of Transportation (NYSDOT), the route continued for another  to the northwest of NY 303 until by 2017. NY 340 was assigned to part of its modern routing in the early 1930s and extended to its current length in the early 1940s.

Route description

NY 340 begins at the New Jersey–New York border in Palisades. Directly south of the border is Rockleigh, New Jersey, in which the route continues as that state's CR 501. The route heads northward through the town of Orangetown, serving a residential community before entering a more forested area and crossing over the Palisades Interstate Parkway (PIP). Not far to the north is the densely populated hamlet of Sparkill, where the highway passes Rockland Country Club and John O'Rourke Memorial Park. In the center of Sparkill, NY 340 indirectly connects to southbound U.S. Route 9W (US 9W) and meets CR 8, the only county route that NY 340 comes in contact with. Just past the indirect junction with US 9W is an intersection with Ferdon Avenue, where maintenance of NY 340 shifts from NYSDOT to the town of Orangetown.

Here, it indirectly connects to US 9W northbound. Outside of the village limits, NYSDOT resumes maintenance of the highway as it traverses areas more commercial and educational in nature. Along this last stretch, NY 340 passes St. Thomas Aquinas College before intersecting NY 303 near the hamlet of Orangeburg. This junction serves as the northern terminus of NY 340; however, the route officially continued for another  to a 90-degree turn where Orangeburg Road (NY 340) becomes Greenbush Road. One block north of this point is the eastern terminus of CR 20, which provides access to the PIP from NY 303 and NY 340. It was truncated to end at NY 303 by 2017.

History

The alignment that currently is modern NY 340 was first constructed in the early 1800s by local judge and entrepreneur  Cornelius Blauvelt. The road was constructed to connect Tappan Landing (current-day Piermont) with then the settlement of Greenbush for purposes of transporting produce.

The portion of modern NY 340 south of Sparkill was originally designated as part of US 9W in 1927. At the time, US 9W continued south into New Jersey on what is now CR 501 and north from Sparkill on its modern alignment. By 1929, US 9W was realigned near the New York–New Jersey state line to run along the Hudson River from Fort Lee, New Jersey, to Sparkill. The former routing of US 9W between the state line and Sparkill was designated as NY 340 . NY 340 was extended northwestward to its current northern terminus in the early 1940s.

Major intersections
Despite NY 340 having an east-west designation, much of the route is north-south and its mileposts begin at its western terminus.

See also

References

External links

340
Transportation in Rockland County, New York